The Final Lesson is a 2015 French drama film directed by Pascale Pouzadoux and starring Sandrine Bonnaire and Marthe Villalonga. The film is based on the 2004 novel La Dernière Leçon by Noëlle Châtelet.

Cast 
 Sandrine Bonnaire as Diane 
 Marthe Villalonga as Madeleine
 Antoine Duléry as Pierre
 Gilles Cohen as Clovis
 Grégoire Montana as Max
 Sabine Pakora as Victoria
 Charles Gérard as Charly
 Roby Schinasi as Christophe
 Emmanuelle Galabru as Caroline
 Jonas Dinal as Didid
 Barbara Schulz as Diane's colleague
 Armelle as The nurse

References

External links 
 

2015 films
2015 drama films
2010s French-language films
French drama films
Films based on French novels
Films about euthanasia
Films about old age
Films about families
Drama films based on actual events
Films directed by Pascale Pouzadoux
2010s French films